On 12 June 2015, four people, including a 4-year-old girl, were killed in a car bombing in Gothenburg, Sweden. The bombing was seen as part of the gang conflicts in the city, as at least one of the victims was a known gang leader.

Bombing
On Friday evening, 12 June around 17:00 CEST, a car exploded near a roundabout in Torslanda, Gothenburg. Roads were thereafter closed off, and several witnesses who were in a state of shock were taken care of in the local church in Amhult. 

A pre-school child reported to have been one of four killed in the bombing was identified as a 4-year-old girl. The girl was reportedly off on the Friday to go fishing with her father, a 29-year-old who also died in the bombing. The car bombing took place amid an increase of homicides in Sweden, which was described as being "in an extreme situation" compared to other Nordic countries.

Investigation
The attack was seen in the context of retaliatory revenge killings in Gothenburg in recent years. The bombing was in October 2015 changed to be investigated as suspected murder, after it was believed that a bomb had been deliberately placed in the car by people other than those present. All three men were confirmed by police to have been connected to gang conflicts in the city. A 32-year-old man who died in the bombing was confirmed to have been a known Gothenburg gang leader.

A person aged in the 20s was arrested in January 2016, suspected of complicity to the bombing.

See also
2015 Gothenburg pub shooting
List of grenade attacks in Sweden

References

Attacks in Europe in 2015
Car and truck bombings in Europe
Child murder
Mass murder in 2015
2015 murders in Sweden
People murdered by organized crime
Organized crime events in Sweden
2010s in Gothenburg
June 2015 crimes in Europe
Incidents of violence against girls
Murdered Swedish children